Aweil North County, is a county of Northern Bahr el Ghazal state, South Sudan.

References

Counties of South Sudan